Interventricular sulcus may refer to:
 Posterior interventricular sulcus, one of the two grooves that separates the ventricles of the heart, near the right margin
 Anterior interventricular sulcus, one of two grooves that separates the ventricles of the heart, never the left margin